Arthur Mitchell may refer to:

Arthur Mitchell (cricketer) (1902–1976), England Test cricketer
Arthur Mitchell (dancer) (1934–2018), African-American dancer and choreographer
Arthur Mitchell (physician) (1826–1909), antiquary, commissioner of Lunacy
Arthur Mitchell (Yukon politician) (born 1950), leader of the Canadian Yukon Liberal Party
Arthur Brownlow Mitchell, Member of the Parliament of Northern Ireland for Queen's University of Belfast
Arthur Crichton Mitchell (1864–1952), Scottish physicist and meteorologist
Arthur Percy Mitchell (1880–1968), provincial politician from Alberta, Canada
Arthur W. Mitchell (1883–1968), first African-American elected to the United States House of Representatives as a member of the Democratic Party